Marcelo Arévalo was the defending champion but lost in the second round to Marcelo Tomás Barrios Vera.

Marc-Andrea Hüsler won the title after defeating Adrián Menéndez Maceiras 7–5, 7–6(7–3) in the final.

Seeds
All seeds receive a bye into the second round.

Draw

Finals

Top half

Section 1

Section 2

Bottom half

Section 3

Section 4

References

External links
Main draw
Qualifying draw

San Luis Open Challenger Tour - Singles
2019 Singles